The Zamindars of Bihar were the autonomous and semi-autonomous rulers and administrators of the Mughal subah of Bihar and later during British rule. The zamindars of Bihar were numerous and could be divided into small, medium and large depending on how much land they controlled. 
Within Bihar, the zamindars had both economic and military power. Each zamindari would have their own standing army which was typically composed of their own clansmen.

The majority of these zamindars usually belonged to upper-caste Hindu communities such as Rajputs, Maithil Brahmins, Bhumihars, Kayasthas or Muslims. 

The Forward Caste Zamindars also participated in the politics of state of Bihar, and had significant presence in  politics in the first few decades of independence, but since 1970, they started losing this presence and according to DM Diwakar, former Director of AN Sinha Institute of Social Sciences, they were converted into "silent onlookers" by 2020, amidst assertion of Backward Castes and Dalits.

Relations with the Mughals
Mughal rule in Bihar was characterised as turbulent and volatile as many of the region's zamindars made continuous efforts to defy the imperial authority.
Generally, the Mughals had great difficulty in subduing the chiefs of Bihar. Many of the major zamindaris and chieftaincies in the suba of Bihar were located in hilly and forested areas which proved beneficial in terms of dealing with potential conflicts. These zamindars had an obligation to pay tribute to the Mughal authorities but rebellions were common and in many instances the army would have to be sent in to Bihar to subdue the rebellious zamindar. 

A notable instance of this occurred in 1503 when Raja Sangram Singh of Kharagpur Raj rebelled and was subsequently killed in battle. His son was then converted to Islam and became a staunch ally of the Mughals.

The nineteenth century British civil servant, John Beames noted about Mughal-ruled Bihar that "everyone who was powerful enough to rob the state or his neighbours, robbed to his hearts content".                                                                   Zamindars refusing to pay the state and gathering forces to attack neighbouring zamindars was a common practice in Bihar during this period.

This attitude to authority continued into the period when the Nawabs of Bengal and Murshidabad became the nominal governors of Bihar. Although Bihar had the potential to provide a large amount of revenue and tax, records show that the Nawabs were unable to extract any money from the chiefs of Bihar until 1748. And even following this, the amount gained was very low. This was again due to the rebellious nature of the zamindars who were "continually in arms".

1781 rebellion against the British

After the collapse of the Mughals, the British East India Company held sway over much of South Asia. In 1781, their control of Bihar was disturbed when some of the zamindars (especially those in South Bihar) started to rise in revolt following the rebellion of Chait Singh, the Maharaja of Benares state. Among the rebels in Bihar, were Raja Narain Singh of Seris-Kutumba, Akbar Ali of Narhat Samoy and Fateh Bahadur Sahi of Huseypur. Among the motivations for the rebellion was the reluctance of these zamindars to provide revenue to the British. However, many zamindar in Bihar were also loyal to the British and refused to take part. Eventually the British were able to subdue the rebellion without too much trouble.

Social condition in Zamindari areas
The Permanent Settlement act by the British East India Company did not significantly alter the landholding patterns in Bihar, leaving Rajputs and Bhumihars as the major Zamindars. It curtailed some of their powers, but also took away the customary occupancy rights of the peasantry. The British rule enabled Rajputs to continue their dominance by cementing their entitlements related to land and tax collection. Exercise of coercive power by the dominant castes over the vulnerable landless labourers took various forms such as forced labour, higher rents, lower wages, social restrictions, evictions and sexual harassment. Rape of women from lower caste by Rajput and Bhumihar landowners was common in the Shahabad district, particularly in couple of villages of Bhojpur (modern name for Shahabad district), where sexual desire of the upper-castes was satisfied through arrogant and unrestricted access to the modesty of women belonging to Chamar and Musahar caste. Emerging organizations of middle peasant castes like Triveni Sangh and Kisan Sabhas took up the issues of exploitation, with the Naxal threat also acting as a check.

Abolition and decline in political presence of Zamindars

Following independence in 1947, there was large-scale support in Bihar for the abolition of zamindari especially among peasants, agricultural labourers and the urban middle-class who stood to gain the most from this. This culminated in a large-scale movement in support of abolition led by lower-castes. The Bhumihar zamindars realised that abolition was going to occur and planned for abolition to be on their terms. However, the Rajput-Kayastha zamindars strongly resisted this.
Eventually, the Bihar Abolition of Zamindaris Act was passed in 1949.

In the later period of time, when the abolition of Zamindari took place in Bihar and the castes like Yadav, Kurmi, Koiri and Bhumihar became the prime movers of the emerging capitalist agriculture system of central Bihar. The new semi-feudal social order brought unintended benefits for these caste groups in which the question of dignity and minimum wages came to the fore. The Green Revolution further benefited these communities.

Prior to the independence of India, many forward caste Zamindars started taking interest in politics, and they also participated in the Quit India Movement, anticipating the end of British rule, which protected them. According to DM Diwakar, a former director of Patna’s AN Sinha Institute of Social Sciences, these feudal elites had significant presence in politics of the state in first few decades of the post-independence period, but they started losing this significant position in 1970s. In the first tenure of Nitish Kumar, they staged a comeback in the politics of state, but in the next tenures, they were completely marginalised and according to Diwakar, were converted into "silent onlookers" by 2020.

Notable zamindari estates

Banaili
Deo Raj
Murho Estate
Hathwa Raj
Tekari Raj
Kharagpur Raj
Bettiah Raj
Jagdishpur estate
Dumraon Raj
Raj Darbhanga
Cheros of Palamu
Ramgarh Raj
Sonbarsa Raj
Jharia Raj
Gidhaur Raj

See also
 Indian feudalism
 Indian honorifics
 Jagirdar
 Ghatwals and Mulraiyats
 Thakur
 Zamindars of Bengal

References

History of Bihar
Zamindari estates